Shehzada is a 2023 Indian Hindi-language action film directed by Rohit Dhawan and co-produced by T-Series Films, Haarika & Hassine Creations, Geetha Arts and Brat Films. A remake of the 2020 Telugu film Ala Vaikunthapurramuloo, it stars Kartik Aaryan, who also co-produced the film, alongside Kriti Sanon, Paresh Rawal, Manisha Koirala, Rajpal Yadav, Ronit Roy and Sachin Khedekar.

Principal photography commenced in October 2021 and ended in January 2023. The film is shot extensively in Mumbai, Delhi and Mauritius. The film score and soundtrack album are composed by Pritam. Initially scheduled for theatrical release on 10 February 2023, Shehzada was released a week later on 17 February, due to the success of Pathaan. The film received mixed to negative reviews from critics and was a commercial failure. 

As per the exchange site Film industry India, Shehzada just procured ₹26.50 crore net in the primary week. It made ₹20 throughout the end of the week.

Plot
Valmiki and Randeep start their career as clerks in the company of Aditya Jindal. Randeep, who marries Jindal's daughter Yasoda "Yasu", becomes wealthy while Valmiki remains poor. On the day of the birth of both their children, Randeep's son appears to be dead. When nurse Sulochana informs Valmiki about this, he pities Randeep and Yasu and offers to exchange his baby with the dead one.

After switching them, however, the apparently dead child begins to cry. Sulochana tries to switch them back, but Valmiki, sensing an opportunity that his son would have a better life growing up in a rich family, prevents her from switching, pushing her accidentally off a ledge. Sulochana goes into a coma, while Valmiki gets a leg cramp that makes him limp permanently. The two boys grow-up in different ways. Raj, raised at Jindal's house, is timid, innocent, and soft-spoken, while Bantu, who is raised at Valmiki's house, is smart, truthful, outspoken, and hard-working. Valmiki, who favours Raj, treats Bantu with disgust due to his true parentage.

After his MBA was denied by Valmiki, Bantu heads to an interview for a job at a law firm headed by a young woman named Samara. Samara initially rejects him for the job but is later impressed by his knowledge and quick-wittedness and hires him. Bantu starts to develop romantic feelings for Samara. Meanwhile, Raj returns from abroad, having finally completing his MBA after multiple failed attempts. Jindal sends Raj to reject Sarang, a wealthy, powerful and influential man who offers to buy 50% of their company's shares. Randeep watches the deal from a restaurant where Samara has a meeting with Kakkar, who attempts to bribe her to move a case in his favour. When Samara refuses and he keeps on insisting, Bantu interferes and supports Samara in the matter. Randeep is disappointed by Raj's hesitance and inability to say no to Sarang but is proud of Bantu and Samara for saying no to Kakkar. Following this, Raj is engaged with Samara on Jindal's suggestion, but Samara has fallen in love with Bantu.

When Samara reveals her feelings for Bantu, he convinces her to ask Randeep to call-off her marriage with Raj. Sarang attempts to kill Randeep for refusing to sell the shares moments before Samara and Bantu arrive to call off the marriage. Bantu saves Randeep by taking him to the hospital despite several attempts by Sarang's men to stop them. There he meets Sulochana, who comes out of her coma and reveals Bantu's true parentage. The furious Bantu slaps Valmiki, telling him that he learned the secret about his birth. Bantu then manages to enter Randeep's house. Jindal is fond of Bantu for saving Randeep.

Bantu begins to address the issues plaguing the house by patching up Randeep's broken relationship with Yasu (which was fragile, as Randeep had an affair once with a woman 7 years ago), settling the dispute with Sarang, and reforming the corrupt family members Kailash and Arun. He and Samara also tell the truth to Raj about their relationship and Raj calls of his marriage with Samara, also making his parents realize that he is an adult and should be allowed to take his own decisions regarding his life and career. At a party thrown at their house, Sarang uses the situation to his advantage by kidnapping and threatening to kill Yasu unless Randeep gives away the shares to him.

Bantu thrashes Sarang and his goons and saves Yasu. Bantu and Valmiki arrive at Jindal's house, where Jindal slaps Valmiki and reveals that he overheard the conversation between Sulochana and Bantu right before her death. Bantu unites with his biological father, Randeep but asks him not to reveal the truth to Yasu, fearing she might be disheartened to know that Raj is not her real child. Unaware of this, Yasu remarks that Bantu is equal to Raj as he saved her and the family, thereby giving Bantu 50% of its shares. Yasu then asks Valmiki to train Raj for five years to be as competent as Bantu and become the CEO of the company. Bantu also forgives Valmiki and mends his relationship with him.

Cast
 Kartik Aaryan as Bantu Nanda
 Kriti Sanon as Samara Singh
 Paresh Rawal as Valmiki Upadhyay, Bantu's foster father
 Manisha Koirala as Yashoda 'Yashu' Nanda, Bantu's biological mother 
 Ronit Roy as Randeep Nanda, Bantu's biological father
 Rajpal Yadav as Inspector Satish Yadav
 Sachin Khedekar as Aditya Jindal, Yashoda's father and Bantu's biological grandfather
 Debattama Saha as Nisha, Bantu's foster sister and Raj's biological sister
 Ankur Rathee as Raj Nanda, Valmiki's biological son
 Sunny Hinduja as Sarang
 Vin Rana as Vikrant
 Ashwin Mushran as Kailash Jindal
 Ali Asgar as Arun
 Shalini Kapoor as Aarti Jindal

Production

The film was announced on 12 October 2021. Principal photography began on the next day i.e. 13 October 2021 in Mumbai. The next schedule took place in Delhi. After many sequences were shot in Mauritius, filming wrapped up on 10 January 2023.

Soundtrack 

All the songs are composed by Pritam while the song "Character Dheela 2.0" from 2011 film Ready has been recreated by Abhijit Vaghani and Pritam. The lyrics are written by Kumaar, Mayur Puri, Shloke Lal and IP Singh.

The first single titled "Munda Sona Hoon Main" was released on 16 January 2023. The second single titled "Chedkhaniyan" was released on 24 January 2023. The third single titled "Mere Sawaal Ka" was released on 2 February 2023. The fourth single titled "Character Dheela 2.0" was released on 9 February 2023. The song, Character Dheela 2.0, is a remix of the same song, Character Dheela, from Salman Khan's Ready (2011).

Release

Theatrical 
Shehzada was released on 17 February 2023. Initially the film was scheduled for theatrical release on 4 November 2022 but was delayed due to  production.

 Home media
The digital streaming rights of the film are acquired by Netflix in ₹40 crore.

 Reception 

 Box office 

 Critical response 
On review aggregator Rotten Tomatoes, the film holds an approval rating of 38% based on 8 reviews and received mixed to negative critical response.

As a critic, Sukanya Verma for Rediff wrote: "Kartik's No Allu Arjun" and went ahead to add on that: "It's nearly not enough to make an already brainless movie a better one." Rahul Desai in this review for Film Companion wrote: "A Kartik Aaryan Entertainer that forgets to entertain" whereas another critic labelled Aaryan as a "Royal Bore" synonymous to the film title. Nandini Ramnath of Scroll Magazine stated: "Rehash of Telugu hit is catnip for Kartik Aaryan fans"  Dhaval Roy of The Times of India gave the film 3.5 stars (out of 5) and called out: "With campy humour and action, this is just a mass entertainer". Saibal Chatterjee of NDTV Movies stated: "Take Kartik Aaryan Out, There Might Not Be Much Left. The obsolescence of the film's essence is difficult to shrug off."

Unmesh Punwani of Koimoi opined: "The film nails the worst parts (story, screenplay) of Ala Vaikunthapurramuloo and misses to master its best parts (music, lead's swag). Shalini Langer of The Indian Express stated: "Only Manisha Koirala and Ronit Roy come out of this Kartik Aaryan starrer with some dignity intact. That’s more than can be said about the audience. It should be a crime to make such films in 21st century." Ziniya Bandhyopadhyay wrote for India Today that the film was a disappointment of massive proportions. In his review for The Hindu, Anuj wrote :Kartik Aaryan can’t salvage this prince of pointless banter. It's the wrong vehicle to launch Kartik Aaryan into the universe of a mass entertainer. Pratyusha Mishra for The Quint Magazine called the film "A Royally Painful Massy Film" At Firstpost, Vinamra Mathur wrote: "The problem with the remake is it never earns the mood it wants to create." Devesh Sharma of Filmfare'' opined: "Don’t expect anything to make sense because it doesn’t. The original was extremely loud and over the top, so the remake can hardly be less so."

References

External links

 Shehzada at Bollywood Hungama

2020s Hindi-language films
2023 films
Indian action films
2023 action films
Films shot in Mumbai
2023 comedy films
Hindi remakes of Telugu films

Shehzada box office : https://sacnilk.com/articles/entertainment/box_office/Shehzada_2022_Box_Office_Collection_Day_Wise_Worldwide?hl=en